is a small but very old and historically important Shinto shrine in Kamakura, Kanagawa Pref., Japan.

History
Although officially called , this tiny shrine  in Zaimokuza is universally known as Moto Hachiman ("original Hachiman", a nickname which appears even on road signs), and in front of its torii stands a stele with the words . This unattended shrine consists of just a torii, two stone lanterns (tōrō), and a honden or sanctuary, where the kami Hachiman is enshrined. It is however illustrious because it is the original location of the great Tsurugaoka Hachiman-gū, symbol of Kamakura.

The sign that stands in front of the shrine says:

About the  origin of the name Tsurugaoka Hachiman-gū, the Azuma Kagami says that: 
"Minamoto no Yoriyoshi, after his victorious campaign against Abe no Sadatō, in August 1063 erected this temple and transferred in it part of Kyoto's Iwashimizu Hachiman-gū's kami. In February 1081 the shrine was repaired by Minamoto no Yoshiie." 
It is likely that this area was then called "Tsurugaoka".
On the 12th day of the 10th month of 1180 Minamoto no Yoritomo, in order to worship his ancestors, had Yui Wakamiya transferred from its current spot to the mountain north of an area called Kobayashi, and that became Tsurugaoka Hachiman-gū. When the Azuma Kagami says that Minamoto no Yoritomo at last visited his distant ancestors at Tsurugaoka Hachiman-gū, it means this shrine. The new shrine used its predecessor's name without changes. From that moment, this place has been called Moto Hachiman. 

Yoriyoshi's decision had profound consequences for the country, because, since Hachiman was the Minamoto's tutelary kami, Kamakura was now the land of his family's ancestors. This, together with the fact Kamakura is a natural fortress and his desire to leave Kyoto, convinced Yoritomo this was the right place to found his shogunate. As a consequence, Kamakura became the unofficial capital of Japan.

It is unclear when the shrine's official name was changed into Yui Wakamiya.
Moto Hachiman is National Historic Site.

Notes

References

External links 
 Area:Zaimokuza by the Kamakura Citizen's Net, retrieved on June 22, 2008.

Buildings and structures in Kamakura, Kanagawa
Shinto shrines in Kanagawa Prefecture